Blurton is a surname. Notable people with the surname include:

 Ashley Blurton (born 1975), Australian footballer 
 Ian Blurton (born 1965), Canadian musician and record producer
 Richard Blurton (born 1952), British archaeologist

See also
 Blurton, village in Staffordshire, England